Death of the Inhumans is a 2018 American comic book story arc published by Marvel Comics.

Publication history
"Death of the Inhumans" was announced on March 28, 2018, as a project by Donny Cates and Ariel Olivetti scheduled to be released starting in July 2018 as a five-issue miniseries.

Premise
The premise deals with the Kree plotting to get the Inhumans to join them by using a Super-Inhuman they created to kill some of them to serve as a warning to those who don't take up their offer.

Plot
The Kree have initiated a murdering campaign in order to force Black Bolt to join the Kree Empire. This ultimatum causes the deaths of 1,038 Inhumans with the words "Join or Die" carved into their bodies, which forced Black Bolt to call together the four Queens of the Universal Inhuman tribes to respond to this threat. However, the meeting goes far from as planned, as an Inhuman executioner named Vox, a Super-Inhuman created by the Kree, begins his bloody rampage across the place. When Black Bolt, Medusa, Gorgon, Karnak, Crystal, Triton, and Lockjaw reach the meeting place, they discover the bodies of Oola Udonta, Aladi Ko Eke, Onomi Whitemane, and Goddess Ovoe, with the same three words written in their blood on a banner hanging about their corpses. They eventually realize that the victims had fallen into a trap as one of the dead Inhumans was wired with an explosive. While most of Black Bolt's group made it out alive thanks to Lockjaw, Triton was not so lucky and was killed in the explosion. Black Bolt then sent Lockjaw to New Arctilan to retrieve his brother Maximus. Unbeknownst to them, Vox and his men had already arrived on New Arctilan and began murdering every Inhuman they come across, old or new like Flagman, Glass Girl, Naja, and Sterilon. Armed with all of the Inhumans’ abilities and no humanity, Vox easily cuts his prey down with his powers or his literal energy scythe. Even Maximus can’t defeat Vox as he quickly loses an arm for even making the attempt. Soon after, Lockjaw arrives and helps Maximus with his attempt to stop Vox on their own but things don't go so well as Vox fires an enormous blast, ripping a hole in both of them.

The Royal Family eventually reaches the now burned Kingdom of New Arctilan and mourn the death of its citizens. Karnak, who can see the flaw in all things, is then sent to the Kree Commander to relay a message from Black Bolt, learning in the process that the Kree intend to rebuild Hala and enslave the Inhumans as their intended soldiers and slaves. The Kree Commander explains how they dispatched Ronan the Accuser as leader of the Kree after Hala was placed in ruin by Mister Knife and have begun to forge a new life. When asked to kneel, Karnak doesn’t. Instead, he does his best to fend off Vox only for the Super-Inhuman is able to subdue Karnak. As Black Bolt arrives, he walks through the halls of the Kree base speaking every name of the fallen Inhumans, making it a song about death. Eventually, it comes down to just Black Bolt vs. Vox who's holding Karnak as a shield. Black Bolt signs to Karnak to have Vox take him instead. Vox apparently accepts the change as he teleports himself behind Black Bolt. Before Karnak’s very eyes, Vox slits Black Bolt’s throat.

The Kree take Black Bolt prisoner and repair the damage done to his throat without using any sedatives or anesthesia to dull the pain which prompted them to think that Black Bolt's great power is gone when he doesn't scream and therefore the prophecy about the Midnight King is no longer a threat to the Kree. However, while being transported, it turns out he still has his voice, but its faint. After killing several Kree, Black Bolt secures a firearm and finds Ronan the Accuser alive. However, he is a prisoner of Vox and having been experimented on alongside the Kree soldiers that are loyal to Ronan. Black Bolt learns of this when he sees that Ronan has been converted to a cyborg. At Ronan’s request, Black Bolt enables him a mercy killing by whispering "You are forgiven." Elsewhere, Medusa and the surviving Inhuman Royal Family members try to recruit Beta Ray Bill in their fight against Vox and the Kree.

The Inhuman Royal Family are finally taking the battle to the Kree and arrive just in time to save Black Bolt from Vox. Thanks to the interference of Beta Ray Bill, the Inhuman Royal Family are able to overpower and kill Vox, but not before he's apparently able to kill Crystal. They soon realize to their surprise that Vox was actually Maximus in disguise concluding that the Super-Inhuman isn’t a person. Instead, it is a programmed and it is also revealed that the voice power everyone assumes is vaporizing his targets was actually just teleporting them instead as it was seen after Crystal’s apparent death, she has been transported to an unknown place where Kree scientists are experimenting on the Inhuman victims who were supposedly killed. While Lockjaw isn’t seen, Triton appears to be in some kind of stasis tank alongside Naja, Sterilon, and other unnamed Inhumans. Crystal is now doomed to be the next Vox.

While recapping the deaths that Vox has caused, Black Bolt also recalls the prophecy of the Midnight King. Meeting up with the Inhuman Royal Family and Beta Ray Bill, Black Bolt is told by Karnak of Vox being a programming that transported his "victims" to the Kree. With the Kree planning to turn any captive Inhumans into Vox, Karnak states that not all of them will be rescued. As Black Bolt has one more scream left, Karnak tells him to make it count. Using his sign language, Black Bolt addresses the others on how he has made mistakes in the past and apologizes to them. After holding a moment of silence, Black Bolt orders Gorgon to turn around. Meanwhile, the Kree Commander speaks with Vox about letting Black Bolt escape. Vox states that Black Bolt will come for his people. A Kree interrupts them stating that a ship is coming at them fast. The Inhuman ship strikes the Kree's base. Vox then pushes a button to activate the Vox-controlled Inhumans. As Gorgon and Beta Ray Bill engage the Kree soldiers, Black Bolt, Medusa, and Karnak arrive at the laboratory where they find Vox-controlled Inhumans like Crystal and Lockjaw. Using a laser, Black Bolt clears the Vox-controlled Crystal and Lockjaw just because they were in his way. Entering one door, Black Bolt signs "I love you. I'm sorry" before whispering for them to run. As Medusa and Karnak fight the Vox-controlled Crystal and Lockjaw, Black Bolt confronts other Vox-controlled Inhumans like Triton. Knowing the truth about the prophecy, Black Bolt brings ruin to the Kree and unleashes his scream on the Vox-controlled Inhumans, killing them all. This action frees Crystal and Lockjaw from Vox's control. Gorgon and Beta Ray Bill arrive stating that the Kree have fled and see Crystal and Lockjaw still alive. Black Bolt emerges from the room as Medusa orders Lockjaw to take them away from the Kree base. When Crystal asks where they should go, Black Bolt uses his sign language to say "home." Lockjaw then teleports them away.

Collected edition

References

External links 
 

Inhumans
Marvel Comics storylines
Comic book limited series
2018 comics debuts